Toni Braxton is the debut studio album by American singer Toni Braxton, released on July 13, 1993, by LaFace Records and Arista Records. The album was primarily produced by L.A. Reid, Babyface, and Daryl Simmons.

The album has sold 5,135,000 copies in the United States and 10 million copies worldwide.
It earned Braxton several awards, including three Grammy Awards (for Best New Artist and two consecutive awards for Best Female R&B Vocal Performance in 1994 and 1995). She also won two American Music Awards (for Favorite Soul/R&B New Artist and Favorite New Adult Contemporary Artist) in 1994 and another one in 1995 (for Favorite Soul/R&B Album).

Background
Braxton and her four sisters Traci, Towanda, Trina, and Tamar signed with Arista Records as The Braxtons in 1989. The following year, the group released their debut single, "Good Life". Though the song was commercially unsuccessful, it attracted the attention of record executive Antonio "L.A." Reid and record producer Kenneth "Babyface" Edmonds, who were shopping around for talent for their new label LaFace Records. Instead of signing the quintet, they opted to offer Braxton a contract as a solo artist. With only one year to finish at Bowie State University, where she was studying to become a music teacher, she relocated to Atlanta to pursue a singing career.

Release
The first single, "Another Sad Love Song", peaked at numbers seven and two on the Billboard Hot 100 and Hot R&B/Hip-Hop Songs charts, respectively. The album's second single, "Breathe Again", reached the top five of both the Hot 100 and R&B charts and at number two on the UK Singles Chart. Other singles were released from Toni Braxton in 1994, including "You Mean the World to Me", "Seven Whole Days", and the double A-side "I Belong to You"/"How Many Ways".

In Japan, the album was released as Love Affair, also a song on the album. The Japanese edition contains the same track listing as the standard version; the only difference is the Obi strip and the bonus lyrics booklet written in Japanese.

Critical reception

Toni Braxton received mixed to positive reviews from music critics. Ron Wynn from AllMusic said that the album showcased Braxton as "an elegant and earthy songstress, nicely balancing those seemingly divergent sentiments [...] Braxton's husky, enticing voice sounds hypnotic, dismayed, and disillusioned [...] but she's never out of control, indignant, or so anguished and hurt that she fails to retain her dignity." Los Angeles Times critic Connie Johnson wrote: "Sounding like an unlikely hybrid of Phyllis Hyman, Anita Baker and Tracy Chapman, Braxton's sultry, earthy delivery makes her a standout in today's R&B arena." Similarly, People found that "when Braxton slides into her lower register she echoes Anita Baker, and when she skips around the higher notes there's also a hint of Whitney Houston. The influences are there, but Toni Braxton is most definitely her own woman. On this sophisticated, stylish and soulful album, she slates her case."

Mitchell May, writing for the Chicago Tribune, noted that "Braxton wisely lets the mood of a tune dictate her approach, allowing her to supply an emotional depth that perhaps even the songwriters didn't know was there." He also found, however, that "the disc loses steam around midpoint." In a mixed review, Rolling Stone journalist John McAlley felt that "Braxton has got chops and spunk... And, yes, there are a handful of songs in which she gets to do the do. But there's not a poet in the house among LaFace's family of writer-producers – no Smokey Robinson, no Linda Creed. And for all its polish, too much of the music on Toni Braxton mistakes melodrama for passion and set pieces for soul." Marisa Fox of Entertainment Weekly found much of the album "generic" and concluded that Braxton "can sing, but there's nothing in her songs or delivery to set her apart from any number of wine-cooler R&B divas." Village Voice critic Robert Christgau gave the album a "neither" rating in his Consumer Guide book.

Accolades
The album earned Braxton several awards, including three Grammy Awards (for Best New Artist and two consecutive awards for Best Female R&B Vocal Performance in 1994 and 1995). She also won two American Music Awards (for Favorite Soul/R&B New Artist and Favorite New Adult Contemporary Artist) in 1994 and another one in 1995 (for Favorite Soul/R&B Album).

Commercial performance
Toni Braxton debuted at number 36 on the Billboard 200 for the week ending July 31, 1993. Following Braxton's appearance at the American Music Awards of 1994, the album rose from number seven to number one in its 31st week on the chart, on the issue dated February 26, 1994, becoming the first number-one album for LaFace Records. It spent a second non-consecutive week atop the Billboard 200 for the week ending March 19, 1994, following the 36th Annual Grammy Awards. The album has sold 5,135,000 copies in the United States and 10 million copies worldwide.

Track listing

Notes
  Despite not being credited as songwriters of "How Many Ways" in the album's liner notes, Keith Miller, Philip Field, and Anthony Beard are listed as songwriters by ASCAP and BMI.
  signifies a co-producer
  signifies a remixer and additional producer
  signifies a remix producer

Personnel
Credits adapted from the liner notes of Toni Braxton.

Musicians

 Toni Braxton – lead vocals ; background vocals 
 Kayo – bass 
 Babyface – keyboards ; background vocals 
 L.A. Reid – drums 
 Debra Killings – background vocals 
 DeRock – percussion 
 Vance Taylor – keyboards ; acoustic piano 
 Pamela Copeland – background vocals 
 Tammy Davis – background vocals 
 Keisha Jackson – background vocals 
 Tim & Ted – drums, keyboards 
 Skip Pruitt – saxophone 
 Tim Thomas – background vocals 
 Tye-V – background vocals 
 Bo Watson – keyboards ; synthesizer programming, vocal arrangement, rhythm arrangement 
 McArthur – guitar 
 Tomi M – guitar 
 Trina Broussard – background vocals 
 Valerie Davis – background vocals 
 Rex Rideout – keyboards, programming 
 Ernesto Phillips – guitar 
 Orlando Phillips – bass guitar

Technical

 L.A. Reid – production ; mixing ; executive production
 Babyface – production ; executive production
 Daryl Simmons – production 
 Jim "Z" Zumpano – engineering 
 John Rogers – engineering 
 Barney Perkins – mixing ; engineering 
 Dave Way – mixing 
 John Frye – mixing assistance ; additional MIDI programming ; engineering assistance 
 Tim & Ted – production 
 Ron Horvath – engineering 
 Phil Tan – engineering 
 Thom Kidd – engineering 
 Ted Bishop – engineering 
 Brad Gilderman – engineering 
 Randy Walker – technician 
 Bo & McArthur – production 
 Jason Schablik – engineering assistance 
 Jon Gass – mixing 
 Fil Brown – engineering 
 Steve Schwartzberg – engineering 
 Matt Westfield – engineering 
 Sean Young – engineering 
 Milton Chan – mixing assistance 
 Vassal Benford – production 
 Victor Flores – engineering, mixing 
 Vincent Herbert – production, mixing 
 Ben Garrison – engineering, mixing 
 Ernesto Phillips – production, mixing 
 Toni Braxton – co-production 
 Bill Plummer – engineering 
 Bob Rosa – mixing 
 Dana Vlcek – mix engineering assistance 
 Herb Powers Jr. – mastering
 Constance Armstrong – album coordination
 Davett Singletary – project coordination

Artwork
 Susan Mendola – art direction
 Daniela Federici – photography

Charts

Weekly charts

Year-end charts

Decade-end charts

All-time charts

Certifications and sales

Release history

See also
 List of Billboard 200 number-one albums of 1994
 List of Billboard 200 number-one R&B albums of 1993

Notes

References

1993 debut albums
Albums produced by Babyface (musician)
Albums produced by L.A. Reid
Arista Records albums
LaFace Records albums
Toni Braxton albums